Dragan Stojkić (born October 7, 1975 in Split, Yugoslavia) is a Bosnian-Herzegovinian retired football goalkeeper.

He is considered the best goalkeeper in the Israeli league alongside Hapoel Tel Aviv's  Vincent Enyeama. He is best known for his remarkable reflexes and his 1 on 1 abilities. In a local interview Stojkić revealed that he had some offers from the English premier league as he declined them all due to his loyalty to his former club NK Zagreb as he was the club's captain, he also mentioned his intentions of continuing to coach goalies for F.C. Ashdod's youth's department once he retires.

International career
He made one appearance for Bosnia and Herzegovina, coming on as a half time substitute for Tomislav Piplica  in a March 2002 friendly match against Macedonia.

References

External links

Dragan Stojkić profile at Nogometni Magazin 

1975 births
Living people
Footballers from Split, Croatia
Association football goalkeepers
Bosnia and Herzegovina footballers
Bosnia and Herzegovina international footballers
HNK Hajduk Split players
NK Samobor players
NK Slaven Belupo players
NK Široki Brijeg players
NK Zagreb players
NK Marsonia players
HNK Šibenik players
FC Luch Vladivostok players
F.C. Ashdod players
Hapoel Ashkelon F.C. players
HNK Zmaj Makarska players
Croatian Football League players
Russian Premier League players
Israeli Premier League players
Liga Leumit players
Second Football League (Croatia) players
Bosnia and Herzegovina expatriate footballers
Expatriate footballers in Croatia
Bosnia and Herzegovina expatriate sportspeople in Croatia
Expatriate footballers in Russia
Bosnia and Herzegovina expatriate sportspeople in Russia
Expatriate footballers in Israel
Bosnia and Herzegovina expatriate sportspeople in Israel